Cheb i Sabbah (7 August 1947 – 6 November 2013) was a DJ and composer/producer known for combining Asian, Arabian, and African sounds into his compositions. Sabbah was of Jewish and Berber descent. He was born in Algeria and came from a family of musicians. When he was a teenager, Sabbah moved to Paris and, in 1964, began his career DJing American soul music records. In 1984, he settled as a DJ in San Francisco. In 1989 he began using the stage name "Cheb i Sabbah", which translates to "young of the morning". He has seven recordings on the Six Degrees Records label.

Sabbah's performances included live musicians, dancers and massive projected visuals, backing up his electronic music. He was nominated for the BBC's 2006 Award for World Music in the Club Global category.

His song "Toura Toura: Nav Deep Remix" was featured in soundtrack of FIFA 08 as well as Cricket 07.

Sabbah was diagnosed with stage 4 stomach cancer in May 2011.
He died on November 6, 2013 in San Francisco.

Discography
 Shri Durga (1999)
 Maha Maya-Shri Durga Remixed (2000)
 Krishna Lila (2002)
 Krishna Lila Select (Bhajans) (2002)
 La Kahena (2005)
 La Kahena Remixed-EP (2005)
 La Ghriba-La Kahena Remixed (2006)
 Devotion (2008)
 Samaya: A Benefit Album For Cheb i Sabbah (2012)

References

External links

 Cheb i Sabbah on Six Degrees Records
 Cheb i Sabbah on SoundCloud
 Interview. AsianVibrations.com

1947 births
2013 deaths
Algerian emigrants to the United States
Algerian Jews
Ambient musicians
American people of Algerian-Jewish descent
American Sephardic Jews
Deaths from stomach cancer
Electronica musicians
Musicians from the San Francisco Bay Area
People from Constantine, Algeria
American world music musicians
Six Degrees Records artists
Algerian electronic musicians